Eliezer Simon Kirschbaum was an Austrian physician and writer. He was born in Sieniawa, Galicia, 1797 and died at Cracow 1860. After studying philosophy and medicine in Berlin, he settled as a physician in Cracow, and as "Der Berliner Doctor" soon acquired an extensive practice and accumulated a considerable fortune.

In order to be able to secure the estate of Siemota, near Chrzanow, he adopted the Christian religion, and assumed the name of "Sigismund." As a married man he permitted his wife to remain a law-abiding Jew throughout her life.

Kirschbaum was the author of a long Hebrew essay, entitled "Hilkot Yeme ha-Mashiaḥ." In the German language he published "Der Jüdische Alexandrinismus," Leipzig, 1841, and "Der Familie Apotheose," Cracow, 1858.

References

1797 births
1860 deaths
19th-century Austrian physicians
Austrian male writers
Austrian Jews